Cherrish Pryor is an American politician from Indianapolis, Indiana. She is a Democratic member of the Indiana House of Representatives, representing the 94th District since 2008. She has served as the Democratic Floor Leader since 2018. The first African American to hold the leadership position. She is also Treasurer for the National Black Caucus of State Legislators.  A role she has held since 2021 and was recently re-elected to serve another two year term which will end in 2025.

Pryor began her political career as an Indianapolis City-County Council member, representing the 7th District from 2007 to 2008.

Pryor is a native of Holly Springs, Mississippi and has lived in Indiana since 1986. She graduated from South Side High School in Fort Wayne, Indiana in 1988. She holds a BA from Indiana University in Criminal Justice and a MPA from Indiana University Purdue University (IUPUI).

She moved to Indianapolis in 1995 to work for the Indiana House of Representatives as a legislative intern and was hired as a full-time legislative assistant within two months.

External links
Indiana State Legislature - Representative Cherrish Pryor Official government website
Project Vote Smart - Representative Cherrish S. Pryor (IN) profile

Living people
People from Holly Springs, Mississippi
Politicians from Fort Wayne, Indiana
Indianapolis City-County Council members
Democratic Party members of the Indiana House of Representatives
African-American state legislators in Indiana
African-American women in politics
Women state legislators in Indiana
Indiana University Bloomington alumni
Women city councillors in Indiana
21st-century American politicians
21st-century American women politicians
Year of birth missing (living people)
African-American city council members
21st-century African-American women
21st-century African-American politicians